Jytte Solveig Hansen (25 July 1932 – 26 November 2015) was a Danish swimmer who won a silver medal in the 200 m breaststroke at the 1954 European Aquatics Championships. She competed in the same event at the 1948, 1952 and 1956 Summer Olympics with the best achievement of fifth place in 1952.

Biography
Hansen started swimming in a club in 1946. Already in 1948, she won the national championships in the 100 m and 200 m breaststroke and reached the finals at the 1948 Olympics. In 1958 she married her coach, Jørgen Nielsen, and changed her last name. After retiring from competitions she worked for 37 years as a swimming coach.

References

1932 births
2015 deaths
Danish female swimmers
Swimmers at the 1948 Summer Olympics
Swimmers at the 1952 Summer Olympics
Swimmers at the 1956 Summer Olympics
Female breaststroke swimmers
Olympic swimmers of Denmark
European Aquatics Championships medalists in swimming
Sportspeople from Odense